Militello in Val di Catania (Sicilian: Militeḍḍu) is a comune (municipality) in the Metropolitan City of Catania in the Italian region Sicily, located about  southeast of Palermo and about  southwest of Catania, on the last slopes of the Hyblaean Mountains. It has a railway station on the line Catania-Gela.

History
Despite remains of prehistorical settlements and legends of a Roman foundation, the first mention of Militello dates from 1000 AD, when it became a marquisate under the Cammarana.

The golden age of Militello was during the early 17th century, under the government of Prince Francesco Branciforte. The city was destroyed by an earthquake in 1693, but the subsequent restoration added numerous architectural and artistic works of art.

Main sights

Together with other cities of the Val di Noto, Militello has been inscribed in the UNESCO World Heritage Sites List. Its main artistical attractions include:

Churches
Mother Church of San Nicolò and Santissimo Salvatore (18th century)
Santa Maria la Vetere, with a 1506 portal by Antonello Gagini
Madonna della Catena (17th century), with a 16th-century niche
Abbey of San Benedetto (17th century)
Sant'Antonio da Padova, with a bell tower from 1719
Santa Maria della Stella (18th century)Santissimi Angeli Custodi late 18th century, with a precious ceramics pavement

PalacesBarresi Branciforte Castle, with the Fountain of the Nymph Zizza (17th century)Palazzo Baldanza-Denaro (17th century)Palazzo Niceforo (18th century)Palazzo Baldanza (19th century)Palazzo Majorana della NicchiaraPalazzo TineoPalazzo ReburdonePalazzo Reina''

See also
 Val di Catania

References

External links

Cities and towns in Sicily
World Heritage Sites in Italy